Lake Region High School can refer to

 Lake Region High School (Florida)
 Lake Region High School (Maine)
 Lake Region Union High School (Vermont)